Alexander Park (Александровский парк) is a park in Tsarskoye Selo outside St. Petersburg.

References

Parks and open spaces in Saint Petersburg
Cultural heritage monuments of federal significance in Saint Petersburg